Elmopalooza! is a 1998 children's album featuring songs performed by characters from Sesame Street with special musical guests. First released on CD and cassette in 1998, this album is the soundtrack to the Elmopalooza television special which commemorated Sesame Streets 30th anniversary. This album won the 1999 Grammy Award for Best Musical Album for Children.

The album was re-issued in 2008 by Koch Records with the same tracks, but with new cover art and including a booklet containing the lyrics.

Track listing

"Mambo I, I, I" - Gloria Estefan
"I Want a Monster to Be My Friend" - En Vogue
"The Zig Zag Dance" - Mighty Mighty Bosstones and Count von Count
"Nearly Missed" - Rosie O'Donnell and Elmo
"Just Happy to Be Me" - The Fugees
"I Don't Want to Live on the Moon" - Shawn Colvin and Ernie
"I Love Trash" - Steven Tyler
"Caribbean Amphibian" - Jimmy Buffett, Kermit the Frog & The All-Amphibian Band
"Happy to Meet You" - Celine Dion, Big Bird, Elmo & Herry Monster
"One Small Voice" - Kenny Loggins and the Kids
"Songs" - Elmo and the Kids

References

1998 albums
Sesame Street albums
Grammy Award for Best Musical Album for Children